Uwu Lena is a German pop group which consists of eight members from Münster. During the 2010 FIFA World Cup, Uwu Lena covered Lena Meyer-Landrut's version of the winning song of the Eurovision Song Contest 2010, "Satellite", written by American songwriter Julie Frost and Danish songwriter John Gordon.  They called the German language cover version "Schland o Schland".

History of the band
The name of the pop group,  "Uwu Lena" is a combination of Uwe Seeler, Vuvuzela and Lena. The band consisted of students from Münster. Besides Christian Landgraf, the writer of Schland o Schland, the band comprised Timo Buehring, Nikolai Gaschütz, Sören Glück, Jötten John, Robert Krotoszynski, Matthias Landgraf and Moritz Schefers.<ref>John Puthenpurackal, Eva de Lubomirz: Lena cae en lo real de las listas? in: bild.de. 20 June de 2010.</ref> Before the publication of "Schland o Schland" the band had also sung together, but not in the intention to commercialize their songs. The publication of the music, just before the World Cup 2010 was, due to Johannes Jötten, coincidental, because the song was only considered to be destined for their friends and acquaintances. Following the publication of Schland o Schland'' by Universal Music the band appeared on several events and television programs, including the ZDF Fernsehgarten on June 20, 2010.

Discography
 Schland o Schland (single) 2010 (Universal B003S9W698)

References

External links 
 Sitio
 Schland-o-Schland

German pop music groups
Münster